Islam Grčki is a village within the town of Benkovac, in the Zadar County, Croatia.

Geography

Name
The original name of the village was Saddislam, meaning "The wall of Islam" in Turkish which marked the final frontier of the Ottoman Empire.

In the 18th century, when the village split in two, the name changed to Islam Grčki. While Islam stayed from the original name, the adjective  (meaning "Greek") stands for the religion of the villagers - Orthodoxy. The other part of the split up village, Islam Latinski, got its name from the religious belief of its settlers - Catholicism.

History
The history of Islam Grčki goes back to the Middle Ages. The village was an Uskok stronghold in the 16th and 17th century.
The most notable Uskok leader Stojan Janković got possession of the village after the Cretan War. He built the villages most notable object - the Janković Kula.

During World War II the village, a Serb enclave surrounded by Croatian villages, was a firm Chetnik militia stronghold. Some villagers also joined the Italian collaborationist Anti-Communist Volunteer Militia.

After World War II the village became part of the Socialist Republic of Croatia.
During the Croatian war of independence the village was one of the first areas under Krajina Serb control.
The village was partly destroyed by shelling during the Croatian-led Operation Maslenica and was overtaken by the Croatian forces on 22 January 1993.

A big part of the villages population fled during the war and the village itself suffered a lot material damage. Janković Kula, for instance, was destroyed in the shelling of 1993 but was being rebuilt as of 2012.

Demographics
The village is predominantly ethnic Serb, and as of 2011 has 150 inhabitants. This represents 13.17% of its pre-war population according to the 1991 census.

The 1991 census recorded that 87.00% of the village population were ethnic Serbs (991/1139), 9.39% were Croats (107/1139) while 3.61% were of other ethnic origin (41/1139).

Sights
 Orthodox Church of St. George
 The Stojan Janković' Tower

See also

 Islam Latinski
 Operation Maslenica
 Donji Kašić
 Smoković

Sources

Benkovac
Populated places in Zadar County
Serb communities in Croatia